Leipzig-Möckern is a railway station located in Leipzig, Germany. The station is located on the Leipzig–Großkorbetha railway. The train services are operated by Deutsche Bahn and Erfurter Bahn. Since December 2013 the station is served by the S-Bahn Mitteldeutschland.

Train services
Abellio Rail Mitteldeutschland, Erfurter Bahn, and S-Bahn Mitteldeutschland services currently call at the station

References

External links

Mockern
Leipzig Mockern